Otari-Wilton's Bush is a native botanic garden and forest reserve located in Wilton in Wellington, New Zealand. 
It is the only public botanic garden that is dedicated solely to the native plants of New Zealand.

Overview 

Otari-Wilton's Bush is a public botanic garden dedicated solely to New Zealand native plants. It is the only garden of this type in New Zealand. The forest in the reserve contains some of the oldest trees in Wellington, including an 800-year-old rimu.

Otari–Wilton's Bush is classified as a 6Star rated garden by the New Zealand Gardens Trust. It is also one of the Founding Gardens of the Trust. Otari-Wilton’s Bush has also received an international Green Flag Award that recognises and rewards well managed parks and green spaces and around the world.

Otari-Wilton's Bush is owned and managed by the Wellington City Council.

Location and access
The gardens are located at 160 Wilton Road, approximately 5 km from the city centre.  Public transport to the gardens is available via the No 14 Wilton bus route from the city centre. There are also car parks at the Wilton Road and Churchill Drive entrances.

There is a path suitable for wheelchairs from Wilton Road to the Visitor Centre, and from there to the Cockayne Lookout via the Canopy Walkway.  There is also an accessible path along the Kaiwharawhara Stream from the carpark off Churchill Drive to the Troup Picnic Lawn.

Entry is free, and the gardens are open daily between sunrise and sunset.

History 
The original forest in the area surrounding Otari-Wilton's Bush was a podocarp broadleaf forest. The area was known as a good place to catch birds, and this gives rise to the Māori name: “Place of snares”.  Large trees in the wider area were felled for timber when European settlers arrived in the region, and farms were established.

In 1860, a far-sighted local farmer Job Wilton fenced off a  area of original forest to protect it from stock. This became known as Wilton’s Bush.  In 1906 the forest was designated as scenic reserve, and in 1918, the land was transferred to Wellington City Council for “recreation purposes and for the preservation of native flora”. By 1926, the site was known as the Otari Open-Air Native Plant Museum. The first director of the reserve was Leonard Cockayne.  In the 1920s he worked together with J.G. MacKenzie, the director of Wellington Parks and Reserves, on plans for the open-air plant museum. The name was changed to Otari–Wilton’s Bush in 2000, recognising the influences of both Maori and Europeans.

Native botanic gardens 

The native plant collections at Otari-Wilton's Bush contain about 1,200 species, including hybrids and cultivars representing plants from mainland New Zealand and off-shore islands.

The plants on display have generally been raised from seeds or cuttings collected from their original environments. The four main objectives of the collection are:
 Conservation: raise seedlings of threatened species, either to be kept in the gardens for conservation purposes, or for use in plant recovery programmes in the wild.
 Research: enable scientific study of the plant collections for plant ecology, classification and economic potential.
 Education: help visitors learn about plant names and characteristics, including providing labelling.
 Recreation: enable visitors to observe New Zealand's unique flora and enjoy the Otari Wilton's Bush environment and facilities.

Collections
The plants are arranged in distinct collections, including an alpine garden, a fernery, hebe and flax cultivars, a large rock garden, grass and sedge species, and a coastal garden. A detailed and interactive online map of the gardens published by the Wellington City Council provides the location of each collection, and a list of the plants that can be found in that section of the gardens.

Plant conservation 
In April 2019, a report by Statistics New Zealand on the conservation status of indigenous land species identified species classified as threatened with or at risk of extinction.  For vascular plants, a total of 1,253 species were identified (representing 46 percent of known species). Human settlement has caused many plants to disappear from New Zealand's forests, wetlands and coasts. Major losses are blamed on industries such as agriculture and forestry, and the introduction of animal pests and invasive weeds.

The Native Botanic Gardens at Otari-Wilton's Bush include many New Zealand plants that are threatened in the wild. Some of these plants are raised and either kept at Otari-Wilton's Bush as a conservation measure, or returned to original habitats as part of plant conservation recovery programmes. One example of plant conservation work at Otari-Wilton's bush is the planting of seeds of New Zealand’s only fully parasitic flowering plant, Dactylanthus taylori (Te Pua o te Rēinga) that were translocated from Pureora forest in 2020.

A wide range of organisations work in partnership with Otari-Wilton's Bush on plant conservation, including The Museum of New Zealand Te Papa Tongarewa, Victoria University of Wellington, the Department of Conservation and The New Zealand Institute of Plant & Food Research Limited.

Forest reserve 
Larger trees in the forest include podocarps such as matai, miro, totara and rimu. Examples of these large trees can be seen from the canopy walkway. The larger trees will often have perching plants (epiphytes) in higher branches. Climbing plants are also common throughout, including supplejack, New Zealand passionfruit,  and several species of rata (metrosideros). On the upper slopes, the predominant trees are mahoe, rewarewa, tawa and kohekohe, with some forest remnants of matai and rimu. In damp areas, there are pukatea that typically have large plank buttress roots to support their growth.

The high south-facing slopes in the reserve are covered in regenerating scrub that is dominated by introduced plants such as gorse and Darwin's barberry, although native plants such as rangiora and mahoe can also be found.

Visitor attractions 

The Visitor Centre provides information about New Zealand's flora (and fauna), and Otari – Wilton's Bush.  It is open 8am–4pm daily.  In December 2021, the Visitor Centre was reopened after a two month closure for renovations, and was renamed: 'Tāne Whakapiripiri'. There are displays and information for visiting groups, and a small lecture room that is available for educational purposes.  The Leonard Cockayne Centre is a seminar and function room located in a stand-alone building adjacent to the Leonard Cockayne memorial lawn.

Canopy walkway 
A 75-metre-long canopy walkway, beginning at the Information Centre, links the two main garden areas.  It is 18 metres above the ground and stream below.

Forest trails and walking tracks 
There are walks and trails within the forest and gardens to suit a range of ages and abilities. Good walking footwear and appropriate clothing for the weather conditions is recommended.

 Circular Walk – a walk through gardens and forest. Some steps, and steep in places. 30 minutes return from the Information Centre.
 Nature Trail – a self-guided walk through gardens and forest, with notes contained in a pamphlet that is available at the Information Centre. Some steps and steep in places. 30–40 minutes return from the Information Centre.
 Blue Trail – forest trail through dense kohekohe forest. Features an 800-year-old rimu. The track is steep in places with some steps.  One hour and thirty minutes return from the Information Centre.
 Red Trail – forest trail through tawa-dominated forest. Challenging with some steps and steep in places.  1 hour return from the Information Centre.
 Yellow Trail – a forest trail through the steep-sided Bledisloe Gorge. Challenging with some steps and steep in places.  1 hour return from the Information Centre.
 Kaiwharawhara Trail – a gentle walk through regenerating forest along the Kaiwharawhara Stream from the Troup Picnic area to Ian Galloway Park. 30 minutes return from the Troup Picnic area.
 Skyline Loop Track – access to the western hills Skyline Walkway; from the Flax Clearing via the Red or Yellow Trails, or via the Blue Trail. Challenging with some steps and steep in places.  Two and a half hours return, from the Information Centre.

Fauna 

Birds seen (and/or heard) at Otari – Wilton's Bush include kererū, tūī, kingfisher, fantail, grey warbler, silvereye and morepork. The reserve holds interesting species of fishes and amphibians. weta are also present.

Otari-Wilton's Bush Trust 
The Otari-Wilton's Bush Trust was formed as a Registered Charitable Trust in 2001.  The trust deed registered with the application describes the principal purpose of the trust as: "To educate the local and wider community in New Zealand flora, thereby fostering public awareness and appreciation of native plants and of the environmental importance of their protection, conservation and rehabilitation and promoting the unique botanic diversity of Otari-Wilton’s Bush". The trust is a member of the New Zealand Plant Conservation Network.

One of the founding trustees was the renowned New Zealand botanist John Dawson.

Although Otari-Wilton's Bush is owned and managed by the Wellington City Council, the Otari-Wilton's Bush Trust has a significant role in supporting the objectives of the gardens, via education programmes, marketing initiatives and hands on volunteering.

See also
Leonard Cockayne
New Zealand Plant Conservation Network
Botanic Gardens Conservation International

References

External links 

Otari-Wilton's Bush Official Wellington City Council website
StoryMap Portal to Otari-Wilton's Bush interactive GIS maps and stories
Otari-Wilton's Bush Trust website of the trust
Trail maps for Wilton's Bush and surrounds
Wellington Walks: Otari-Wilton’s Bush and Skyline Walkway

Botanical gardens in New Zealand
Tourist attractions in Wellington City
Protected areas of the Wellington Region
Parks in Wellington City